Barney Martin (March 3, 1923 – March 21, 2005) was an American actor, best known for playing Morty Seinfeld, father of Jerry, on the sitcom Seinfeld (1991-1998). He also played supporting roles in Mel Brooks' The Producers (1967), and the Dudley Moore comedy Arthur (1981). He also originated the role of Amos Hart (Mr. Cellophane) in the 1976 Broadway production of Chicago.

Early life 
Born in New York City, Martin served in the U.S. Army Air Force as a navigator during the Second World War before working as an NYPD officer for twenty years, working his way up to detective. He got his start as a comedian while still a police officer, providing deputy commissioners with humorous presentations.

Martin once commented that many Jewish Seinfeld fans told him how much his character reminded them of their fathers. Martin himself was from an Irish Catholic family.

Career 
Entering show business as a stand-in for Jackie Gleason in The Honeymooners in 1955–56 and as a part-time writer for Steve Allen in the 1950s, he was discovered by Mel Brooks, who cast him in The Producers. The next year, he played the role of Hank in Charly. He went on to act in dozens of films, including the role of Liza Minnelli's unemployed father in the hit 1981 film Arthur and its 1988 sequel, Arthur 2: On the Rocks.

On television, he appeared in two episodes of The Odd Couple, once in a very early episode as an irate fellow juror infuriated with Felix Unger's pesty personality and four years later as a fellow subway train passenger.  Shortly after, Martin co-starred with Tony Randall for two seasons in The Tony Randall Show as court reporter Jack Terwilliger. Throughout the run of this show, he had second billing only to Randall himself. In 1979, he was cast as the title character in Norman Lear's final TV series concept, McGurk: A Dog's Life. Martin was cast to play a character similar to Lear's earlier creation, Archie Bunker, but played as a dog. Only the pilot was completed. In 1990, he co-starred with Valerie Bertinelli and Matthew Perry in the CBS sitcom Sydney.  In 1987, he appeared in the pilot episode of 21 Jump Street as Johnny Depp's partner.  In 1993, Martin played the recurring role of "Pete Peters" on the Don Rickles sit-com Daddy Dearest. Although he was the second actor to portray Jerry's dad, Morty, in the 90s sitcom Seinfeld, he is the one most associated with the role, as the first actor, Phil Bruns, only appeared in one episode.

In 1975, Martin originated the role of Amos Hart in the Broadway musical Chicago, in which he introduced the song "Mr. Cellophane". He appeared in many more musicals during his career, most notably South Pacific, The Fantasticks, and How Now, Dow Jones. Much of Martin's work has been in television, where he had a long career as a character actor. He played a gangster called the "Cheese Man" in a Golden Girls episode. He played a love interest for Thelma Harper in the Hawaii episode of Mama's Family, and he played the father of Frank Fontana on Murphy Brown. He appeared in an episode of Full House as Ranger Roy, the host of a popular kids' TV show. In 1981, he portrayed Ralph Marolla, father of Liza Minnelli's character in the film Arthur and the following year appeared on Barney Miller in the episode "Obituary".

In 1990, Martin was cast as the fictional father of Jerry Seinfeld, Morty Seinfeld in the sitcom Seinfeld. His first appearance was in season 2's "The Pony Remark". Martin replaced Phil Bruns who first portrayed the character in his first appearance in Season 1's "The Stake Out". He took on the role upon showrunners Larry David and Jerry Seinfeld deciding they wanted the character of Morty Seinfeld to be harsher, as they thought Bruns was too laid-back for the character. He retained this role until the series ended in 1998.

Death 
On March 21, 2005, he died of bladder cancer in Studio City, Los Angeles, California, at age 82. He was cremated, and his ashes were returned to his family.

Filmography

Film

Television

Theatre

References 

https://www.imdb.com/title/tt0536385/

External links 

 
 
 

1923 births
2005 deaths
American male film actors
American male musical theatre actors
United States Army Air Forces personnel of World War II
American people of Irish descent
American male television actors
Deaths from cancer in California
Deaths from bladder cancer
New York City Police Department officers
Male actors from New York City
United States Army Air Forces soldiers
People from Queens, New York
20th-century American male actors
American police detectives
Catholics from New York (state)
20th-century American singers
20th-century American male singers